Tomb KV41, located in the Valley of the Kings in Egypt, was the last tomb to be found by Victor Loret, and has not been excavated or examined. The original owner of this tomb is unclear, but it may have been Tetisheri.

According to Donald P. Ryan, it is not a tomb but rather a deep shaft.

References

External links
 Theban Mapping Project: KV41 includes detailed maps of most of the tombs.

1899 archaeological discoveries
Valley of the Kings